Eduardo Rodríguez (born 15 December 1971) is an Argentine volleyball player. He competed in the men's tournament at the 1996 Summer Olympics.

References

External links
 

1971 births
Living people
Argentine men's volleyball players
Olympic volleyball players of Argentina
Volleyball players at the 1996 Summer Olympics
Place of birth missing (living people)
Pan American Games medalists in volleyball
Pan American Games gold medalists for Argentina
Medalists at the 1995 Pan American Games